Yan Zibei (born 12 October 1995) is a Chinese swimmer. He competed in the men's 100 metre breaststroke event at the 2016 Summer Olympics. He won a silver medal when he competed in the 4x100m mixed medley relay at the 2020 Summer Olympics. Yan is the current national record and Asian record holder in the 50m and 100m breaststroke.

Personal bests

Long course (50-meter pool)

Short course (25-meter pool)

Key: NR = National Record ; AS = Asian Record

References

External links

1995 births
Living people
Chinese male breaststroke swimmers
Olympic swimmers of China
Swimmers at the 2016 Summer Olympics
Swimmers from Hubei
People from Xiangyang
World Aquatics Championships medalists in swimming
Asian Games medalists in swimming
Swimmers at the 2018 Asian Games
Medalists at the 2018 Asian Games
Asian Games gold medalists for China
Asian Games silver medalists for China
Swimmers at the 2020 Summer Olympics
Medalists at the 2020 Summer Olympics
Olympic silver medalists in swimming
Olympic silver medalists for China
21st-century Chinese people